Voyages très extraordinaires de Saturnin Farandoul ("The Very extraordinary journeys of Saturnin Farandoul")  is a science-fiction novel by Albert Robida. 

A parody of Jules Verne's Voyages extraordinaires, it was published in over one hundred installments between 1879 and 1880. It was first translated in English by Brian Stableford as The Adventures of Saturnin Farandoul.  The novel proved to be very successful in Italy, where it was adapted into a 1913 Italian silent film, Le avventure straordinarissime di Saturnino Farandola, directed and interpreted by Marcel Fabre  and into a RAI TV-series starring Mariano Rigillo and Daria Nicolodi in 1977.

A comic adaptation by Pier Lorenzo De Vita was published on Topolino in 1938 and 1940, and a three-parts sequel starring Donald Duck in the title role, still written by De Vita and drawn by Guido Martina, was published in 1959. The novel also inspired the Bonvi's comic series Marzolino Tarantola.

References

External links
 
 Voyages très extraordinaires de Saturnin Farandoul at Open Library

1879 novels
French novels adapted into films
Parody novels
French science fiction novels
French novels adapted into television shows